NGC 93 is an interacting spiral galaxy estimated to be about 260 million light-years away in the constellation of Andromeda. It was discovered by R. J. Mitchell in 1854. The galaxy is currently interacting with NGC 90 and has some signs of interacting with it.

NGC 93 and NGC 90 form the interacting galaxy pair Arp 65.

References

External links
 

0093
Andromeda (constellation)
+04-02-012
00209
001412
18541026
Spiral galaxies
Interacting galaxies